Chennai railway division  is a railway division of the Southern Railway (SR), India covering the districts of Northern Tamil Nadu and southern Andhra Pradesh. Currently it has a route length of over 697.42 km. Its administrative headquarters is in Chennai, which also happens to be the headquarters of the Southern Railway.

List of railway stations and towns 
The list includes the stations under the Chennai railway division and their station category.

Stations closed for Passengers -

Padi railway station (Defunct)
Anna Nagar railway station (Defunct)

References

 
Southern Railway zone
Rail transport in Tamil Nadu
1956 establishments in Madras State
Divisions of Indian Railways